Rantala is a Finnish surname.

Geographical distribution
As of 2014, 85.7% of all known bearers of the surname Rantala were residents of Finland, 5.1% of the United States, 3.4% in Sweden, 1.1% of Canada and 1.1% of Estonia.

In Finland, the frequency of the surname was higher than national average (1:628) in the following regions:
 1. South Ostrobothnia (1:262)
 2. Satakunta (1:310)
 3. Pirkanmaa (1:378)
 4. Kymenlaakso (1:452)
 5. Southwest Finland (1:488)
 6. Central Ostrobothnia (1:507)
 7. Päijänne Tavastia (1:537)
 8. Tavastia Proper (1:543)

People
Harri J. Rantala (born 1980), Finnish film director
Iiro Rantala (born 1970), Finnish jazz pianist
Leif Rantala (1947–2015), Finnish linguist
Lene Rantala (born 1968), Danish team handball player
Riku Rantala (born 1974), Finnish journalist, best known from travelling series Madventures

See also
Rantala incident, 7-year-old child with Russian-Finnish dual citizenship taken by the Finnish social service to a children’s shelter in 2010

References

Finnish-language surnames